Prince of Novgorod-Seversk was the kniaz, the ruler or sub-ruler, of the Principality of Novgorod-Seversk. It may have been created in 1139, the date of one modern authority, and is most famous for Igor Sviatoslavich, hero of the Old East Slavic Tale of Igor's Campaign.

List of princes of Novgorod-Seversk
 Sviatoslav Olgovich (d. 1164), Prince of Novgorod (1136–1138) and Novgorod-Seversky (1139)
 Oleg Sviatoslavich, d. 1180
 Igor Sviatoslavich, d. 1202
 Vladimir Igorevich, d. 1208
 Roman Igorevich, d. 1211
 Oleg Igoreivich

In the aftermath of the Mongol invasions, it fell under the control of Briansk. The principality was taken over by the Lithuanians in the fourteenth-century when the power of the Golden Horde began to decline. In the fifteenth-century the principality was given to Prince Ivan of Mozhaisk when he fled from Grand Prince Vasily II.

Under Lithuanian overlordship
 Ivan Dmitrievich of Mozhaisk, d. 1471 x 1485
 Semen Ivanovich, d. x 1500
 Vasily Ivanovich, d. 1519

Notes

References
 Martin, Janet, Medieval Russia, 980-1584, (Cambridge, 1995)

Noble titles of Kievan Rus
Princes of Novgorod-Seversk